Light the Night, previously known as Blue Hour, is a 2021 Taiwanese Netflix original series written by Ryan Tu and directed by Lien Yi-chi. The series stars Ruby Lin, Yo Yang, Cheryl Yang, Rhydian Vaughan, Derek Chang, Puff Kuo, Esther Liu, Cherry Hsieh and Nikki Hsin-ying Hsieh.

Synopsis

Season 1
In 1988, teenagers find a dead body in the woods; months before, two madams at Light Bar struggle with the men in their lives.

Season 2

At the end of the second season of Light the Night, Chiang Han is shown listening to a tape recorder that was handed over to him earlier by Rose. It had a recording of a woman panicking about another woman's death. Just as Chiang Han is on his way to meet Rose, he is hit by a speeding car and collapses on the road

Season 3
We learn that Rose came to work at Light after being released from prison, having taking the fall for her unscrupulous husband (Joseph Cheng). While serving time, Rose befriended Hana (Esther Liu), who also comes to work at Light upon her release.

Cast

Main starring
 Ruby Lin as Lo Yu-nung a.k.a. Rose, the manager of 'Hikari'
 Yo Yang as Pan Wen-cheng, a detective
 Cheryl Yang as Su Ching-yi a.k.a. Sue, the owner of 'Hikari'
 Rhydian Vaughan as Chiang Han, a famous television screenwriter
 Derek Chang as He Yu-en, a college student
 Esther Liu as Li Shu-hua a.k.a. Hana, a hostess of 'Hikari'
 Cherry Hsieh as Chi Man-ju a.k.a. Ah-chi, a hostess of 'Hikari'
 Nikki Hsin-ying Hsieh as Huang Pai-he a.k.a. Yuri, a hostess of 'Hikari'
 Puff Kuo as Wang Ai-lien a.k.a. Aiko, a hostess of 'Hikari', Yu-en's classmate

Co-starring
 Cammy Chiang as Lin Ya-wen a.k.a. Yaya, an accountant and a hostess of 'Hikari'
 Hu Wei-jie as Ting Chia-hao a.k.a. Hsiao-hao, a waiter of 'Hikari'
 Nash Zhang as Li Chien-ta a.k.a. Ah-ta, a detective
 Dora Hsieh as Yen Chiao-ju a.k.a. Mei-mei, a detective
 Jim Liu as Wu Tsu-wei, Yu-nung and Shao-chiang's son

Guest-starring
 Wallace Huo as Ma Tien-hua a.k.a. Hinoki, Ching-yi's sworn brother, a notorious gangster
 Joseph Cheng as Wu Shao-chiang, Yu-nung's husband (part 1, 3)
 Wang Po-chieh as Henry, a host of 'Ciao' who is in love with Yu-ri
 Kai Hsiu as Ko Chih-hao, a prosecutor
 Lee Lee-zen as Hsu Kuo-piao a.k.a. Piao-ke, a gangster (part 1)
 Kagami Tomohisa as Nakamura Masao, a customer of 'Hikari'
 Chu Chung-heng as Sun Ming-chang, Wen-cheng's superior
 Ken Lin as Feng, a television producer (part 1-2)
 Lorene Jen as Hsiao Wan-jou, a famous actress (part 1-2)
 Wu Kang-ren as Liu Pao-lung a.k.a. Pao-pao, the owner of 'Sugar', a cross-dressing hostess (part 2-3)
 Wang Ching-ying as Su Mei-yu, Ching-yi's mother (part 2-3)
 Yi Cheng as Chu Wen-hsiung, the neighbor of the Lo family, Mei-yu's ex-lover (part 2-3)
 Gingle Wang as young Lo Yu-nung (part 2-3)
 Tseng Jing-hua as young Wu Shao-chiang (part 2-3)
 Jean Ho as young Su Ching-yi (part 2)

Guest appearances 
 Greg Hsu as Yu-en's classmate (part 1)
 Shen Meng-sheng as Lo Chun-sheng, Yu-nung's father (part 1-2)
 Moon Wang as Lo Hsieh Hsueh-ling, Yu-nung's mother (part 1-2)
 James Wen as Lo Li-nung, Yu-nung's elder brother (part 1)
 June Tsai as Lo I-nung, Yu-nung's elder sister (part 1-2)
 Ma Nien-hsien as Tsai Huo-wang, the owner of a izakaya
 Heaven Hai as Ko Hsiu-chih, the owner of a barbershop (part 1-2)
 Hans Chung as Kevin Cheng, the manager of 'Ciao' (part 1)
 Chen Bor-jeng as Shu-hua's father (part 1, 3)
 Fan Jui-chun as Ai-lien's mother (part 1, 3)
 JC Lin as a student of mountain climbing club who found dead body (part 1)
 Edison Song as a student of mountain climbing club who found dead body (part 1)
 Ying Tsai-ling as Zhang Yi-fen, the dean of orphanage (part 2-3)
 Kitamura Toyoharu as a customer of 'Hikari' (part 1)
 Berry Kuo as a cake shop clerk (part 2)
 Vivian Hsu as Chiung-fang, the ex-owner of 'Hikari' (part 2)
 Chang Yung-cheng as president Fang, an advertisers who is Hsiao Wan-jou's boyfriend (part 2)
 Austin Lin as magazine club senior (part 2-3)
 9m88 a hostess of 'Hikari' (part 2)
 Tang Chih-wei as Li Ssu-ching, a host of television program (part 2)
 Emerson Tsai as a customer of 'Sugar' (part 3)
 Ray Chang as Shu-hua's ex-boyfriend (part 3)

Supporting 
 Chien Shao-feng as a student of mountain climbing club who found dead body (part 1)
 Wang Yu-hsuan as a student of mountain climbing club who found  dead body (part 1)
 Wu Kun-da as Pai Lung, the owner of cafe (part 1)

Episodes

Production
Six female leads attended the press meeting held in Taipei on September 11, 2020. Also, unveiled their male actors line up on October 14, 2020. Over 250 million Taiwanese dollars were spent to produce the 24-episode series, which features extravagant sets and costumes. The original series planned to be broadcast only in TVBS, but the high-standard production and unique story themes attracted the attention of streaming platform Netflix, and finally they attained its overseas distribution rights for over 300 million Taiwanese dollars.

Release
Light the Night Season 1 was released globally on November 26, 2021 on Netflix. The series' first season was released in three parts. On November 22, 2021, a few days before the series premiere, the first two episodes of the first part was screened at the 58th Taipei Golden Horse Film Festival.

Awards and nominations

Soundtrack  

Light the Night Original Soundtrack (OST) (華燈初上影集原聲帶) was released on January 1, 2022 by various artists. It contains a total of 9 tracks. The OST album is available for streaming on various music streaming platforms

References

External links
 
 
 

Taiwanese drama television series
Taiwanese thriller television series
Taiwanese mystery television series
Crime thriller television series
Mandarin-language Netflix original programming
Television series set in the 1980s
Television series set in 1988
Television shows set in Taipei
Television shows filmed in Taiwan
Television shows written by Ryan Tu
2021 Taiwanese television series debuts
Television series set in restaurants